The Celts Strike Again is the second studio album by the Serbian Irish folk/Celtic rock band Orthodox Celts released in 1997.

The Celts Strike Again was the band's first album to feature their own songs – besides covers of traditional Irish songs, the album features two songs written by the members of the band, "Drinking Song" and "Blue".

The album featured numerous guest musicians: actress Ana Sofrenović on vocals (on the song "Loch Lomond"), Vampiri member Aleksandar Eraković on backing vocals, Stočari member Branko Vitas on banjo, member of the band Pachamama (the band Orthodox Celts recorded the live album Muzičke paralele with) Milan Mihaljčić on khene and thin whistle, and Renesansa member Žorž Grujić on zurla and gajde.

In the cover of the traditional Irish song "I'll Tell Me Ma" the band replaced the line "She's the belle of Belfast City" with "She's the belle of Belgrade City", in reference to their hometown.

Track list 
All songs are covers of traditional songs, except where noted.

Personnel
Aleksandar Petrović - vocals
Dejan Lalić - guitar, banjo, mandolin, tin whistle, backing vocals
Vladan Jovković - guitar, backing vocals
Ana Đokić - violin
Dejan Jevtović - bass
Dušan Živanović - drums, bodhrán, percussion, accordion, backing vocals

Additional personnel
Ana Sofrenović - vocals (on "Loch Lomond")
Aleksandar Eraković - backing vocals
Milan Mihaljčić
Branko Vitas - banjo
Žorž Grujić - zurla, gajde
Aleksandar Radosavljević - producer, engineer
Gojko Stojisavljević - engineer
Ivan Brusić - engineer
Aleksandar Mikić - design

References

The Celts Strike Again at Discogs

External links 
The Celts Strike Again at Discogs

Orthodox Celts albums
1997 albums